The 1270 class were a class of diesel locomotive built by English Electric, Rocklea for Queensland Railways between 1964 and 1966.

History

The 1270 class was devised by English Electric engineer Stan Lyons, based on the body design of North American road switcher but using the same engine and generator as the 1250 class. The first 12 units had the same English Electric 525 traction motors as the 1250 class. The remaining units had improved English Electric 548 traction motors with a slightly higher tractive effort. The final six units had dynamic brakes.

In 1965, 1281 was named Century and painted in a commemorative gold and white livery to mark the centenary of the first railway in Queensland.

They were used on grain trains between the Darling Downs and Brisbane, ore trains on the Mount Isa line and coal trains on the Moura line. With higher power diesel locomotives becoming available in the 1970s, the 1270s were moved to general freight.

Withdrawal & disposal
The 1270 class were displaced from coal traffic with the electrification of coalfields lines from 1986. All were withdrawn between 1987 and 1989. Two units were retained by the Queensland Rail Heritage Division and the remainder were scrapped.

Fleet summary

References

Co-Co locomotives
Diesel locomotives of Queensland
English Electric locomotives
Queensland Rail locomotives
Railway locomotives introduced in 1964
Diesel-electric locomotives of Australia
3 ft 6 in gauge locomotives of Australia